"My Home" is a single released by the Japanese boyband Kanjani8. This release is their 17th single. The single was used as the theme song for the TV Asahi drama, Inu wo Kau to Iu koto ~Sky to Waga ga Uchi no 180 Nichi ~.

Track listing

Regular edition
   (4:31)
 "Baby Moonlight" (3:35)
  (3:35)
  (3:16)
   (4:31)
 "Baby Moonlight (Original Karaoke)" (3:35)

Limited edition
   (4:31)
 "Baby Moonlight" (3:35)

DVD
"My Home" Music Clip and Making

Charts

References

2011 singles
Kanjani Eight songs
Japanese television drama theme songs
Oricon Weekly number-one singles
Billboard Japan Hot 100 number-one singles